

Introduction
Agile Networks was founded in 2011 following a management buyout of the operations of Telindus in Ireland.  The new company acquired the assets, staff and customer base from Telindus following similar management buyouts for other Telindus entities in Spain, Portugal, Sweden, Germany and Italy. The new entity secured funding support from Fingal County Enterprise Board, the local council where Agile Networks has its head office based in Blanchardstown, Dublin 15. In 2017 Agile Networks merged with Plannet21 to create a new IT group targeting revenues of €100M.

Customer Base
Agile Networks' customer base includes technology companies like Digiweb, Hutchinson 3G, and IAC Search and Media; public sector bodies like HEAnet, HSE, and DCU; and large enterprises like Abbott Laboratories, Analog Devices, and Aviva Stadium. Given the company is focused on complex networks it tends to focus on technology led customers and large international organisations based in Ireland. The company's best known project is the development of a 100MB broadband network which was officially completed in December 2014. This network connects all 780 secondary schools in Ireland, ultimately connecting up every post-primary student predominantly funded by the Department of Education and Skills.

Awards
The company has received the following awards to date:

In all cases the judges cited Agile Networks operational model, technical capabilities, and growing list of clients as evidence of success in the marketplace.

Vendor Accreditations
Agile Networks holds the following accreditation from international networking vendors.

References

External links
 Official website

Networking companies
Information technology companies of Ireland